This is a list of cheeses from Cornwall in the United Kingdom. In 2004 there were nearly 60 varieties of cheese produced in Cornwall, and Cornish cheeses have won many awards.

Cornish cheeses

Blissful Buffalo 
Cathedral City Cheddar
Cornish Blue
Cornish Brie
Cornish Organic Brie
St Endellion Cornish Brie
St Agnes Brie
Farmhouse Cornish Brie
Cornish Camembert
Cornish Garland
 Cornish Gouda
Cornish Herb
Cornish Jack
Cornish Kern
Cornish Pepper 
Cornish Tarragon
Cornish Tiskey
Cornish Wild Garlic Yarg
Cornish Yarg
Davidstow Cheddar
Helford Blue
Keltic Gold
Little Stinky
Menallack
Miss Muffet
Mrs Finn
Nanterrow (ewe's milk) 
Tesyn
Toppenrose Gold

See also

List of British cheeses
List of cheeses
 List of English cheeses
List of Irish cheeses
Cornish cuisine

References

Bibliography
Jenny Linford, Great British Cheeses, Dorling Kindersley Ltd, 2008, 

Cornish
Cheeses, Cornish
Cornish

Cheese